The 2011 South Oxfordshire District Council election was held on 5 May 2011 to elect members of South Oxfordshire District Council in England. This was on the same day as other local elections.

Elections were held for all 48 seats on the council. The Conservative Party won 33 seats. The Liberal Democrats won seven seats and Henley Residents Group won two. The Labour Party won one seat and two independent candidates each won a seat. The Conservative Party kept overall control of the council, with its majority reduced to 27.

Summary of results

The Conservative Party's share of votes fell from 50.9% in the 2007 South Oxfordshire District Council election to 46.1% in 2011. In 2011 Conservative candidates won three seats from Liberal Democrats. However, Conservative candidates also lost three seats to independent candidates, three to Labour, one to the Henley Residents Group and one to a Liberal Democrat. The Conservatives had won 38 seats in 2007 but were reduced to 33 in 2011. However, this was still almost 69% of the 48 seats on the council, and gave the Conservative group an overall majority of 15.

The Liberal Democrats' share of votes fell from 28.6% in 2007 to 16.7% in 2011. The net result of their gaining seats from and losing seats to the Conservatives reduced their number of members on the council to four. However, the Liberal Democrats retained the second largest share of total votes in the district.

The Labour Party increased its share of votes from 7.3% in 2007 to 14.6% in 2011. Gaining three seats from the Conservatives increased its number of members on the council to four.

In 2007 two independent candidates were elected to the district council. In 2011 both of these independent councillors were re-elected and three gained seats from Conservatives, increasing the number of independent councillors to five.

In 2007 one Henley Residents Group councillor was elected. In 2011 HRG held that seat and won a second, increasing its number of members on the council to two. HRG won an average of 37.2% of votes in the two wards that it contested.

In 2007 there were Green Party candidates in eight of the district's 29 wards. In 2011 there were only four Green Party candidates in four wards. They won an average of 16.64% of votes in the wards that they contested, and 3.43% of total votes cast in South Oxfordshire District, but no seats.

There was one UK Independence Party candidate, who contested a ward in Didcot. He won 8.6% of the votes in that ward, and was not elected.

Ward results

Aston Rowant

Benson

Berinsfield

Brightwell

Chalgrove

Chiltern Woods

Chinnor

Cholsey and Wallingford South

Crowmarsh

Didcot All Saints

Didcot Ladygrove

Didcot Northbourne

Didcot Park

Forest Hill and Holton

Garsington

Goring

Great Milton

Hagbourne

Henley North

Henley South

Sandford

Shiplake

Sonning Common

Thame North

Thame South

Wallingford North

Watlington

Wheatley

Woodcote

References

2010s in Oxfordshire
2011 English local elections
May 2011 events in the United Kingdom
2011